Stillwater Area Public Schools, also known as Independent School District #834, is a school district serving communities surrounding Stillwater, Minnesota, United States. It currently serves about 8,300 students in 12 schools.

History
Minnesota’s first schoolhouse was built in Stillwater in 1848, a year before Minnesota became a territory. Stillwater became the state’s first school district just two years later. 

From the first one-room schoolhouse, Stillwater Area Public Schools has grown to serve more than 8,300 students in 7 elementary schools (PreK-5), two middle schools (grades 6-8), one high school (grades 9-12), and an alternative learning center for secondary students. An early childhood family center serves families with young children, from birth to age 5.

Area
The district encompasses 18 communities, including: Afton, Bayport, Baytown Township, Grant, a portion of Hugo, Lake Elmo, Lakeland, Lakeland Shores, Lake St. Croix Beach, Marine on St. Croix, May Township, Oak Park Heights, St. Mary’s Point, Stillwater, Stillwater Township, West Lakeland Township, Withrow, and a portion of Woodbury.

Achievements 

-The high school had a 97% graduation rate in 2012-13.

-87% of graduates went on to 2 or 4 year colleges/universities in 2012-13.

-Approximately 1,000 students earn college credit each year while attending Stillwater Area Public Schools.

-Students (at all grade levels) consistently perform above state and national averages on achievement tests.

-Repeated recognition from the AP College Board in the 2013 school year in which 101 students were named AP Scholars, 73 AP Scholars with Honors, 71 AP Scholars with Distinction and three were named AP National Scholars.

-Since 1913, Stillwater has had nearly 60 Minnesota State High School League State Championships in athletics.

-An outstanding music program (band, orchestra and choir) that is highly regarded across the country: The Concert Wind Symphony has the longest streak of superior ratings in the history of Minnesota.

-Derek Olson, a sixth grade teacher at Afton-Lakeland Elementary School, represented the state of Minnesota as the 2008 Teacher of the Year.

Schools

Elementary schools

Afton-Lakeland Elementary School
Andersen Elementary School
Brookview Elementary School
Lake Elmo Elementary School

Lily Lake Elementary School
Rutherford Elementary School
Stonebridge Elementary School

Middle schools
Oak-Land Middle School
Stillwater Middle School

High schools
Stillwater Area High School

Other schools
Early Childhood Family Center (ECFC)
St. Croix Valley Area Learning Center (ALC)

References

External links
Stillwater Area Public Schools

School districts in Minnesota
Education in Washington County, Minnesota
School districts established in 1850